Pokrovka-Ozerki is a rural locality (a village) in Tyuryushlinsky Selsoviet, Sterlitamaksky District, Bashkortostan, Russia. The population was 22 as of 2010. There are 2 streets.

Geography 
Pokrovka-Ozerki is located 32 km southwest of Sterlitamak (the district's administrative centre) by road. Yuzhny is the nearest rural locality.

References 

Rural localities in Sterlitamaksky District